Josh Nurse (born July 17, 1996) is an American football cornerback for the Memphis Showboats of the United States Football League (USFL). He was signed by the Baltimore Ravens as an undrafted free agent in 2020 following his college football career with the Utah Utes.

Professional career

Baltimore Ravens
Nurse signed with the Baltimore Ravens as an undrafted free agent following the 2020 NFL Draft on May 5, 2020. He was waived during final roster cuts on September 5, 2020.

Jacksonville Jaguars
Nurse signed to the Jacksonville Jaguars' practice squad on September 14, 2020, and was released five days later. He re-signed to the practice squad on September 21. He was placed on the practice squad/COVID-19 list by the team on October 17, 2020, and was activated back to the practice squad on October 22. He was elevated to the active roster on November 7 and November 28 for the team's weeks 9 and 12 game against the Houston Texans and Cleveland Browns, and reverted to the practice squad after each game. He was placed back on the practice squad/COVID-19 list on December 18, 2020, and restored to the practice squad again on December 23. He signed a reserve/future contract on January 4, 2021. He was waived on March 17, 2021.

Calgary Stampeders
Nurse signed with the Calgary Stampeders of the CFL on June 23, 2021. He was released on July 25, 2021.

Birmingham Stallions
Nurse signed with the Birmingham Stallions of the United States Football League on June 14, 2022.

Memphis Showboats
Nurse was traded to the Memphis Showboats on January 11, 2023.

References

External links
Jacksonville Jaguars bio
Utah Utes football bio

1996 births
Living people
People from Fayetteville, Georgia
Players of American football from Georgia (U.S. state)
Sportspeople from the Atlanta metropolitan area
American football cornerbacks
Utah Utes football players
Baltimore Ravens players
Jacksonville Jaguars players
Calgary Stampeders players
Birmingham Stallions (2022) players